The Sacred Heart Fires are a fire rite that originated in Tyrol in the 18th century. The fires are still lit in several parts of the Tyrol and Trentino. The custom of lighting a fire in June goes back to earlier solstice of St. John's fires, which were reinterpreted in memory of the "Sacred Heart of Jesus vow" of 1796.

Historical Background 
In the spring of 1796, the Napoleonic Wars hit Tyrol completely unexpected and it was therefore unprepared. The country had remained untouched by hostile actions during the previous years during which the Holy Roman Emperor fought against the French in Belgium and northern Italy. The Tyroleans had the privilege, which Emperor Maximilian I established in the 16th century in the "Landlibell" (charter that regulates the organization of the Tyrolean military), neither to have to take part in wars outside the country, nor to support these wars financially. In return, however, the Tyroleans had to defend their country themselves. This fact was always a thorn in the side of the government in Vienna and because of this, Emperor Joseph II neglected both the annual exercises and armament in Tyrol.

The province of Tyrol mobilized for war in April 1796. This meant that all men fit to carry weapons were trained for the military. After only three weeks, an army of 7,000 men was sent to Tyrol's southern borders. From 30 May to 1 July of the same year, the smaller, 24-member Committee of Tyrolean Estates met in Bozen to discuss of the situation. It was the idea of the priest of Wildermieming, Anton Paufler that the Abbot Sebastian Stöckl of Stamser took up and proposed to the Tyrolean parliament to entrust the land to the "Sacred Heart of Jesus" and thus to receive divine assistance. This proposal was unanimously accepted by the committee members. Special attention was paid to the fact that this solemn oath affected the whole country in order to create a unifying bond. As a result, the Landsturm experienced an unexpected influx of volunteers. When Tyrolean troops surprisingly defeated the French, Sacred Heart Sunday became a high holiday.

Significance of the Sacred Heart Fire 

At that time there were not many possibilities to communicate with distant compatriots. For this reason, signal fires were lit at certain peaks to call for the Landsturm. However, these mountain fires also had something mystical, so that they were lit on the occasion of the festive celebration of the Sacred Heart of Jesus. Thus the Sacred Heart fires came more and more into the foreground compared to the usual solstice fires up to that time.

Recent times 
This tradition is still cultivated today and underlines the connection between the different regions. The fires are often arranged in the form of hearts, crosses or the signs of Christ ("INRI" or "IHS"). They are kindled either on Saturday or Sunday after the feast of the Sacred Heart of Jesus, since this feast is celebrated in Tyrol on Sunday after the actual feast day, which is on a Friday. The Heart of Jesus fires are lit every year in the evening on the 3rd Saturday or Sunday after Whitsun.

On the Sacred Heart in 1961, activists of the BAS blew up 37 power pylons in autonomous province of South Tyrol during the so-called Night of fire to demonstrate against the occupation by the Italians. The aim of the attackers was to make the world aware of the so-called "South Tyrolean question," created by the taking of South Tyrol by Italy after World War I.

Wildfire 
Due to the nature of these fires, wildfires are a constant threat.  A recent example of this was on the evening of Saturday 9 June 2018 when groups put torches on wooden branches on a steep mountain slope above Sautens, Ötztal, Tyrol. On the following day Sacred Heart Sunday, fire brigades, supported by a helicopter, extinguished the resulting fire, which affected 500 m² of the forest.

References 

 Martin Senoner, Die Bedeutung der Herz-Jesu-Verehrung in der Pastoral der Kirche Südtirols (Diplomarbeit), Brixen 1996, page 45
 ↑ Dr. Heinz Wieser: Herz-Jesu-Gelöbnis, in: Osttiroler Bote, Issue of 14 June 2007
 ↑ Bergfeuerfackeln lösten Waldbrand aus orf.at, 11 June 2018

External links 

https://www.suedtirolerland.it/en/highlights/tradition-and-culture/sacred-heart-fires/
https://www.weinstrasse.com/en/highlights/tradition-and-culture/sacred-heart-fires/
https://www.south-tirol.com/culture/traditions/sacred-heart-fires
http://www.rifugiofronza.com/en/Fires-Of-The-Sacred-Heart-Corpus-Christi
https://www.suedtirolprivat.com/en/mir-drzehln/the-culture-of-south-tyrol/71-why-the-mountains-are-ablaze-every-year-in-june.html
https://www.innsbruck.info/en/customs-and-events/events-calendar/detail/event/sacred-heart-fires-on-the-mountains.html
Herz-Jesu-Sonntag - Feuer auf Südtirols Bergen on brauchtumsseiten.de by Sara Ladurner
 Samstag nach dem Herz-Jesu-Fest on boehmpflege-landeck.at (aus Brigitte Teutsch, Günther Haas: Tiroler Brauchtum rund ums Jahr, Kompass-Verlag, 1995)
 Jahresfeuer. Herz Jesu- Feuer – Informationen zum Herz-Jesu-Fest in Tirol on the Universität Innsbruck
 Wochen-Chronik. Der Herz-Jesu-Sonntag gieng auch hier feierlich vorüber, Pusterthaler Bote no. 26, 30 June 1876, page. 101
 Aufrufe zur Herz-Jesufeier. Aufruf zur Bergbeleuchtung, Bozner news no. 111, 16. Mai 1896, S. 3
 Das Herz-Jesu-Fest, Andreas Hofer Wochenblatt no. 25, 18 June 1896, page 294–297
 Das Herz-Jesu-Fest, Andreas Hofer Wochenblatt no. 26, 25 June 1896, page 310–316
 Bergfeuer am Herz Jesu-Fest 21. Juni, Dolomiten Nr. 72, 17 June 1936, page 2
 Hermann Mang: Lodernde Bergfeuer, Dolomiten Nr. 17, 9 June 1945, page 3

Culture of South Tyrol
Christian festivals and holy days